The 2nd constituency of the Loiret (French: Deuxième circonscription du Loiret) is a French legislative constituency in the Loiret département. Like the other 576 French constituencies, it elects one MP using a two round electoral system.

Description

The 2nd Constituency of the Loiret stretches from the north western suburbs of Orléans towards the western edge of department.

In common with the department the seat has historically tended towards the centre right, with Gaullist parties dominating. However, at the 2017 the constituency elected the centrist En Marche! candidate at the expense of the conservative LR incumbent.

Assembly Members

Election results

2022

 
 
 
|-
| colspan="8" bgcolor="#E9E9E9"|
|-

2017

 
 
 
 
 
 
|-
| colspan="8" bgcolor="#E9E9E9"|
|-

2012

 
 
 
 
 
|-
| colspan="8" bgcolor="#E9E9E9"|
|-

References

2